The Clausilioidea are a superfamily of air-breathing land snails and slugs, terrestrial gastropod mollusks in the informal group Sigmurethra.

This classification was based on different studies dealing with the Clausiliidae, published by H. Nordsieck in 1978, 1979, 1981, 1985, 1994, 1997 and 1998.

Taxonomy
Family Clausiliidae  Gray, 1855  
 † Family Anadromidae  Wenz, 1940 
 † Family Filholiidae  Wenz, 1923 
 † Family Palaeostoidae  H. Nordsieck, 1986

References

 Gray, J. E. (1855). Catalogue of Pulmonata or air-breathing Mollusca in the collection of the British Museum, Part I. Taylor & Francis, London. 192 pp.

Stylommatophora
Gastropod superfamilies